The 1948 United States Senate election in Minnesota took place on November 2, 1948. It was the first election held for Minnesota's Class 2 seat in the United States Senate since the Minnesota Democratic Party and the Farmer-Labor Party of Minnesota merged in 1944 to form the Minnesota Democratic-Farmer-Labor Party. Democratic Mayor of Minneapolis and future Vice President Hubert H. Humphrey defeated incumbent Republican Joseph H. Ball, who sought a third term in the Senate. This is the first time a Democrat won a Senate seat in Minnesota through popular vote election.

Democratic–Farmer–Labor primary

Candidates

Declared
 Hubert H. Humphrey, Mayor of Minneapolis since 1945
 James M. Shields

Results

Republican primary

Candidates

Declared
 Joseph H. Ball, Incumbent U.S. Senator since 1943 (also 1940-1942)
 Lenore Irene Bussmann
 Earl L. Miller

Results

General election

Results

See also 
 United States Senate elections, 1948 and 1949

References

Minnesota
1948
1948 Minnesota elections
Hubert Humphrey